The Crime Writers of Canada Awards of Excellence, formerly known as the Arthur Ellis Awards, are a group of Canadian literary awards, presented annually by the Crime Writers of Canada for the best Canadian crime and mystery writing published in the previous year. The award is presented at a gala dinner in the year following publication.

The awards were named for Arthur Ellis, the pseudonym of Canada's official hangman.

In 2021 the Crime Writers of Canada announced that they were retiring Arthur Ellis's name from the awards, renaming them to their current name.

Best Novel

 1984 - Eric Wright, The Night the Gods Smiled
 1985 - Howard Engel, Murder Sees the Light
 1986 - Eric Wright, Death in the Old Country
 1987 - Edward O. Phillips, Buried on Sunday
 1988 - Carol Shields, Swann
 1989 - Chris Scott, Jack
 1990 - Laurence Gough, Hot Shots
 1991 - L. R. Wright, A Chill Rain in January
 1992 - Peter Robinson, Past Reason Hated
 1993 - Carsten Stroud, Lizardskin
 1994 - John Lawrence Reynolds, Gypsy Sins
 1995 - Gail Bowen, A Colder Kind of Death
 1996 - L.R. Wright, Mother Love
 1997 - Peter Robinson, Innocent Graves
 1998 - William Deverell, Trial of Passion
 1999 - Nora Kelly, Old Wounds
 2000 - Rosemary Aubert, The Feast of Stephen
 2001 - Peter Robinson, Cold is the Grave
 2002 - Michelle Spring, In the Midnight Hour
 2003 - Rick Mofina, Blood of Others
 2004 - Giles Blunt, The Delicate Storm
 2005 - Barbara Fradkin, Fifth Son
 2006 - William Deverell, April Fool
 2007 - Barbara Fradkin, Honour Among Men
 2008 - Jon Redfern, Trumpets Sound No More
 2009 - Linwood Barclay, Too Close to Home
 2010 - Howard Shrier, High Chicago
 2011 - Louise Penny, Bury Your Dead
 2012 - Peter Robinson, Before the Poison
 2013 - Giles Blunt, Until the Night
 2014 - Seán Haldane, The Devil's Making
 2015 - C. C. Humphreys, Plague: Murder Has a New Friend
 2016 - Peter Kirby, Open Season
 2017 - Donna Morrissey, The Fortunate Brother
 2018 - Peter Robinson, Sleeping in the Ground
 2019 - Anne Emery, Though the Heavens Fall
 2020 - Michael Christie, Greenwood
 2021 - Will Ferguson, The Finder
 2022 - Dietrich Kalteis, Under an Outlaw Moon

Best First Novel
 1987 - Medora Sale, Murder on the Run
 1988 - Laurence Gough, The Goldfish Bowl
 1989 - John Brady, A Stone of the Heart
 1990 - John Lawrence Reynolds, The Man Who Murdered God
 1991 - Carsten Stroud, Sniper's Moon
 1992 - Paul Grescoe, Flesh Wound
 1993 - Sean Stewart, Passion Play
 1994 - Gavin Scott, Memory Trace
 1995 - Sparkle Hayter, What's A Girl Gotta Do?
 1996 - (tie) John Spencer Hill, The Last Castrato and D.H. Toole, Moonlit Days and Nights
 1997 - C. C. Benison, Death At Buckingham Palace
 1998 - Kathy Reichs, Déja Dead
 1999 - Liz Brady, Sudden Blow
 2000 - Andrew Pyper, Lost Girls
 2001 - Mark Zuehlke, Hands Like Clouds
 2002 - Jon Redfern, The Boy Must Die
 2003 - James W. Nichol, Midnight Cab
 2004 - Jan Rehner, Just Murder
 2005 - Jon Evans, Dark Places
 2006 - Louise Penny, Still Life
 2007 - Anne Emery, Sign of the Cross
 2008 - Liam Durcan, Garcia's Heart
 2009 - Howard Shrier, Buffalo Jump
 2010 - Alan Bradley, The Sweetness at the Bottom of the Pie
 2011 - Avner Mandelman, The Debba
 2012 - Ian Hamilton, The Water Rat of Wanchai
 2013 - Simone St. James, The Haunting of Maddy Clare
 2014 - J. Kent Messum, Bait
 2015 - Steve Burrows, A Siege of Bitterns
 2016 - Ausma Zehanat Khan, The Unquiet Dead
 2017 - Elle Wild, Strange Things Done
 2018 - Dave Butler, Full Curl
 2019 - A.J. Devlin, Cobra Clutch
 2020 - Philip Elliott, Nobody Move
 2021 - Guglielmo D'Izzia, The Transaction
 2022 - Ashley Audrain, The Push

Best Novella
 2013 - Lou Allin, Contingency Plan
 2014 - Melodie Campbell, The Goddaughter's Revenge
 2015 - Jas R. Petrin, A Knock on the Door
 2016 - Jeremy Bates, Black Canyon
 2017 - Rick Blechta, Rundown
 2018 - Mike Culpepper, How Lon Pruitt Was Found Murdered in an Open Field with No Footprints Around
 2019 - John Lawrence Reynolds, Murder Among the Pines
 2020 - Wayne Arthurson, The Red Chesterfield
 2021 - Sam Wiebe, Never Going Back
 2022 - Wayne Ng, Letters from Johnny

Best Crime Book in French
 2000 - Lionel Noël, 
 2001 - Norbert Spehner, 
 2002 - Anne-Michèle Lévesque, 
 2003 - Jacques Côté, 
 2004 - Jean Lemieux, 
 2005 - Ann Lamontagne, 
 2006 - Gérard Galarneau, 
 2007 - No award given
 2008 - Mario Bolduc, 
 2009 - Jacques Côté, 
 2010 - Jean Lemieux, 
 2011 - Jacques Côté, 
 2012 - Martin Michaud, 
 2013 - Mario Bolduc, 
 2014 - Maureen Martineau, 
 2015 - Andrée A. Michaud, 
 2016 - Luc Chartrand, 
 2017 - Marie-Ève Bourassa, 
 2018 - Marie Saur, 
 2019 - Hervé Gagnon, 
 2020 - Andrée A. Michaud, 
 2021 - Roxanne Bouchard, 
 2022 - Patrick Senécal, Flots

Best Juvenile or Young Adult Crime Book
1994 - John Dowd, Abalone Summer
1995 - James Heneghan, Torn Away
1996 - Norah McClintock, Mistaken Identity
1997 - Linda Bailey, How Can a Frozen Detective Stay Hot on the Trail?
1998 - Norah McClintock, The Body in the Basement
1999 - Norah McClintock, Sins of the Father
2000 - Linda Bailey, How Can a Brilliant Detective Shine in the Dark?
2001 - Tim Wynne-Jones, The Boy in the Burning House
2002 - Norah McClintock, Scared to Death
2003 - Norah McClintock, Break and Enter
2004 - Graham McNamee, Acceleration
2005 - Carrie Mac, The Beckoners
2006 - Vicki Grant, Quid Pro Quo
2007 - Sean Cullen, Hamish X and the Cheese Pirates
2008 - Shane Peacock, Eye of the Crow
2009 - Sharon E. McKay, War Brothers
2010 - Barbara Haworth-Attard, Haunted
2011 - Alice Kuipers, The Worst Thing She Ever Did
2012 - Tim Wynne-Jones, Blink & Caution
2013 - Shane Peacock, Becoming Holmes
2014 - Elizabeth MacLeod, Bones Never Lie
2015 - Sigmund Brouwer, Dead Man's Switch
2016 - Stephanie Tromly, Trouble Is a Friend of Mine
2017 - Gordon Korman, Masterminds
2018 - Linwood Barclay, Chase: Get Ready to Run
2019 - Linwood Barclay, Escape
2020 - Tom Ryan, Keep This to Yourself
2021 - Frances Greenslade, Red Fox Road
2022 - Kevin Sands, The Traitor's Blade

Best Crime Nonfiction
 1985 - Martin Friedland, The Trials of Israel Lipsky
 1986 - Maggie Siggins, A Canadian Tragedy
 1987 - Elliott Leyton, Hunting Humans
 1988 - Gary Ross, Stung
 1989 - Mick Lowe, Conspiracy of Brothers
 1990 - Lisa Priest, Conspiracy of Silence
 1991 - Susan Mayse, Ginger: The Life and Death of Albert Goodwin
 1992 - William Lowther, Arms and the Man
 1993 - Kirk Makin, Redrum the Innocent
 1994 - David R. Williams, With Malice Aforethought
 1995 - Michael Harris, The Prodigal Husband
 1996 - Lois Simmie, The Secret Lives of Sgt. John Wilson
 1997 - Jean Monet, The Cassock and the Crown
 1998 - Patricia Pearson, When She Was Bad
 1999 - Derek Finkle, No Claim to Mercy
 2000 - Gordon Sinclair, Jr., Cowboys and Indians
 2001 - A.B. McKillop, The Spinster and the Prophet
 2002 - {tie) Stevie Cameron and Harvey Cashore, The Last Amigo and Andrew Nikiforuk, Saboteurs
 2003 - Andrew Mitrovica, Covert Entry
 2004 - Julian Sher and William Marsden, The Road to Hell
 2005 - Matthew Hart, The Irish Game
 2006 - Rebecca Godfrey, Under the Bridge
 2007 - Brian O'Dea, High
 2008 - Julian Sher, One Child at a Time
 2009 - Michael Calce and Craig Silverman, Mafiaboy
 2010 - Terry Gould, Murder Without Borders
 2011 - Stevie Cameron, On the Farm
 2012 - Joshua Knelman, Hot Art
 2013 - Steve Lillebuen, The Devil's Cinema
 2014 - no award presented
 2015 - Charlotte Gray, The Massey Murder
 2016 - Dean Jobb, Empire of Deception: The Incredible Story of a Master Swindler Who Seduced a City and Captivated the Nation
 2017 - Jeremy Grimaldi, A Daughter's Deadly Deception: The Jennifer Pan Story
 2018 - Trevor Cole, The Whisky King: The remarkable true story of Canada's most infamous bootlegger and the undercover Mountie on his trail
 2019 - Sarah Weinman, The Real Lolita: The Kidnapping of Sally Horner and the Novel that Scandalized the World
 2020 - Charlotte Gray, Murdered Midas: A Millionaire, His Gold Mine, and a Strange Death on an Island Paradise
 2021 - Justin Ling, Missing from the Village
 2022 - Nate Hendley, The Beatle Bandit

Best Crime Short Story
1988 - Eric Wright, "Looking for an Honest Man", in Cold Blood: Murder in Canada
1989 - Jas. R. Petrin, "Killer in the House", in Alfred Hitchcock Mystery Magazine, December 1988
1990 - Josef Skvorecky, "Humbug", in The End of Lieutenant Boruvka
1991 - Peter Robinson, "Innocence", in Cold Blood III
1992 - Eric Wright, "Two in the Bush", in Christmas Stalkings
1993 - Nancy Kilpatrick, "Mantrap", in Murder, Mayhem, and the Macabre
1994 - Robert J. Sawyer, "Just Like Old Times", in On Spec, Summer 1993
1995 - Rosemary Aubert, "The Midnight Boat to Palermo", in Cold Blood IV
1996 - Mary Jane Maffini, "Cotton Armour", in Ladies Killing Circle
1997 - Richard K. Bercuson, "Dead Run", in Storyteller, Winter 1996-97
1998 - Sue Pike, "Widow's Weeds", in Cottage Country Killers
1999 - Scott Mackay, "Last Inning", in Ellery Queen Mystery Magazine, February 1998
2000 - Matt Hughes, "One More Kill", in Blue Murder Magazine, December 1999
2001 - Peter Robinson, "Murder in Utopia", in Crime Through Time III2002 - Mary Jane Maffini, "Sign of the Times", in Fit to Die2003 - James Powell, "Bottom Walker", in Ellery Queen Mystery Magazine, May 2002
2004 - Gregory Ward, "Dead Wood", in Hard Boiled Love2005 - Leslie Watts, "Crocodile Tears", in Revenge: A Noir Anthology2006 - Rick Mofina, "Lightning Rider", in Murder in Vegas2007 - Dennis Richard Murphy, "Fuzzy Wuzzy", in Ellery Queen Mystery Magazine, August 2006
2008 - Leslie Watts, "Turners", in Kingston Whig-Standard, July 7, 2007
2009 - Pasha Malla, "Filmsong", in Toronto Noir2010 - Dennis Richard Murphy, "Prisoner in Paradise", in Ellery Queen Mystery Magazine2011 - Mary Jane Maffini, "So Much in Common", in Ellery Queen Mystery Magazine2012 - Catherine Astolfo, "What Kelly Did"
2013 - Yasuko Thanh, "Spring-blade Knife" in Floating Like The Dead2014 - Twist Phelan, "Footprints in Water"
2015 - Margaret Atwood, "Stone Mattress"
2016 - Jeremy Bates, "Black Canyon"
2017 - Susan Daly, "A Death at the Parsonage"
2018 - Catherine Astolfo, "The Outlier"
2019 - Linda L. Richards, "Terminal City"
2020 - Peter Sellers, "Closing Doors"
2021 - Marcelle Dubé, "Cold Wave, Sisters in Crime"
2022 - Elizabeth Elwood, Number 10 Marlborough PlaceBest Unpublished First Novel - "Unhanged Arthur"
First awarded in 2007 as part of the CWC mandate to recognize and promote the careers of promising new crime writers. 
2007 - Phyllis Smallman, "Margarita Nights"
2008 - D.J. McIntosh, "The Witch of Babylon"
2009 - Douglas A. Moles, "Louder"
2010 - Gloria Ferris, "The Corpse Flower"
2011 - John Jeneroux, "Better Off Dead"
2012 - Sam Wiebe, "Last of the Independents"
2013 - Coleen Steele, "Sins Revisited"
2014 - Rachel Greenaway, "Cold Girl"
2015 - Elle Wilde, "Strange Things Done"
2016 - Jayne Barnard, "When the Flood Falls"
2017 - S. J. Jennings, "The Golkonda Project"
2018 - Dianne Scott, "Destruction in Paradise"
2019 - Liv McFarlane, "The Scarlet Cross"
2020 - Liz Rachel Walker, "The Dieppe Letters"
2021 - Raymond Bazowski, "The Future"
2022 - Renee Lehnen, "Elmington"

Howard Engel Award
2021 - Katrina Onstad, Stay Where I Can See You2022 - C.S. Porter, Beneath Her SkinDerrick Murdoch Award
This is a special achievement award for contributions to the genre of crime and mystery writing, awarded at the discretion of the president of the Crime Writers of Canada. When first presented in 1984, it was known as the Chairman's Award; it was later renamed in honour of its first recipient, Derrick Murdoch. Since 2013, it has only been presented in years when the new biennial Grand Master Award, listed below, is not presented.

1984 - Derrick Murdoch
1985 - Tony Aspler
1986 - Margaret Millar
1987 - The CBC Drama Department
1988 - J.D. Singh and Jim Reicker
1989 - not presented
1990 - Eric Wilson
1991 - not presented
1992 - William Bankier, James Powell and Peter Sellers
1993 - not presented
1994 - not presented
1995 - Jim and Margaret McBride
1996 - not presented
1997 - not presented
1998 - Howard Engel and Eric Wright
1999 - Ted Wood
2000 - Eddie Barber, Rick Blechta, John North and David Skene-Melvin
2001 - L.R. Wright
2002 - James Dubro and Caro Soles
2003 - Margaret Cannon
2004 - Cheryl Freedman
2005 - Max Haines
2006 - Mary Jane Maffini
2007 - not presented
2008 - Edward D. Hoch
2009 - Gail Bowen
2010 - Peter Robinson
2011 - Louise Allin and N.A.T. Grant
2012 - Don Graves and Catherine Astolfo
2013 - Lyn Hamilton
2014 - not presented
2015 - Sylvia McConnell
2016 - not presented
2017 - Christina Jennings
2018 - not presented
2019 - Vicki Delany

Grand Master Award
The Grand Master Award is presented every two years as a lifetime achievement award, to a crime writer with a distinguished and successful national and international career.

2014 - Howard Engel
2016 - Eric Wright
2018 - Gail Bowen
2020 - Peter Robinson
2022 - Louise Penny

Best Genre Criticism/Reference
The award for Best Genre Criticism or Reference has only been presented twice.

1991 - Donald A. Redmond, Sherlock Holmes Among the Pirates1992 - Wesley A. Wark, Spy Fiction, Spy Films and Real IntelligenceBest Play
The award for Best Play has only been presented once.

1994 - Timothy Findley, The Stillborn Lover''

References

External links
Crime Writers of Canada
 List of Arthur Ellis Award winners 1984-Present

Awards established in 1984
1984 establishments in Canada
First book awards
Canadian fiction awards
Short story awards
Mystery and detective fiction awards